The Scottish Hockey Cup or just Scottish Cup is the top men's cup competition in Scottish Field Hockey. The competition starts in September each year, with the final being held in May, at Glasgow's National Hockey Centre.

Format
Clubs enter the Scottish Cup each year through the Scottish Hockey Union and fixtures are drawn up by Scottish Hockey. Recently, the draws have been live streamed on Scottish Hockey's YouTube channel. Teams play each other once, with the winning team going through and losing team entering the Scottish Plate. In the result of tie, teams go to a penalty shoot out.

Past winners

Sponsorship
The first sponsor of the Cup was the Scottish Daily Mail and it was known as the Scottish Daily Mail Trophy. This ran from 1962 until 1971 when the Daily Mail moved to Manchester. After that, The Scotsman took over sponsorship and clubs played for the Scotsman Cup. This ran from 1972 until 1997. Arthur McKay Building Support services sponsored the competition from 2011 until 2013.

Scottish Plate
The Scottish Plate is the second cup competition in Scottish Hockey. It is contested between the teams that are knocked out of the Scottish Cup in the first round. Teams knocked out compete in the same knock out format as the Scottish Cup. The finals are played in May at the same time as the Cup at the Glasgow National Hockey Centre. The first recorded plate match is from the 1998-99 season however other matches may have occurred before that.

Past winners

References

Cup
Scotland
1962 establishments in Scotland